Francisco Denis  (born 1961) is a Venezuelan actor and director.

Denis runs his own theater company in Venezuela, and has acted in about 20 films there.

Selected filmography
Takari de Chivo (TBA) Also director and writer
Benigno Cruz (TBA)
Short Film DEMONICA (2021) 
Operacion Orion  (2021)
The Liberator as Simón Rodríguez (2013)
3 Bellezas (2014)
La Mula Muerta (2012) (Shortfilm)
De repente, la pelicula

Selected television
 Diario de un gigoló (2022)
 The Revenge of Juanas (2021)
 Jack Ryan
 El Comandante as Fernando Brizuela (2017)
 Narcos as Miguel Rodríguez Orejuela (2017)

References

External links

Living people
Venezuelan male film actors
Venezuelan male television actors
1961 births